The 1859 State of the Union Address was written by James Buchanan, the 15th president of the United States. It was read to both houses of the 36th United States Congress on Monday, December 19, 1859, by a clerk. Predicting the American Civil War, he stated, "Whilst it is the duty of the President 'from time to time to give to Congress information of the state of the Union,' I shall not refer in detail to the recent sad and bloody occurrences at Harpers Ferry. Still, it is proper to observe that these events, however bad and cruel in themselves, derive their chief importance from the apprehension that they are but symptoms of an incurable disease in the public mind, which may break out in still more dangerous outrages and terminate at last in an open war by the North to abolish slavery in the South."

References

State of the Union addresses
Presidency of James Buchanan
36th United States Congress
State of the Union Address
State of the Union Address
State of the Union Address
State of the Union Address
December 1859 events
State of the Union